Zhangzhou Prefecture was a prefecture in Fujian Province in China's imperial and early republican eras. The region, especially its governmental/commercial centre, was long known to English-readers accustomed to Wade-Giles romanisation as Changchow fu.

The region has since been reconstituted as Zhangzhou Prefecture-level city.

See also
Zhangzhou

References

Former prefectures in Fujian
Prefectures of the Tang dynasty
Prefectures of the Ming dynasty
Prefectures of the Qing dynasty
Prefectures of the Song dynasty